Hendrik Maarten Krabbé, or Heinrich Martin Krabbé (4 May 1868, London – 22 December 1931, Amsterdam) was a Dutch genre artist and portrait painter.

Biography 
His father worked as a claims examiner for a life insurance company. From 1883 to 1888, he attended the Quellinusschool and the Rijksakademie in Amsterdam, where he studied painting with August Allebé and lithography with Rudolf Stang. After graduating, he lived in Bussum for several years then taught at the School of applied arts in Haarlem from 1896 to 1906.

After 1906, he took up residence at the artists' colony in Laren. During this time, he married the singer Miep Rust (1874-1956). From 1916 to 1923 he was back in Bussum, but spent 1920 on a study trip in Chicago.

He initially painted genre scenes, military personnel and interiors with figures. For the last twenty years of his life, he focused on portraits. He was a long-standing member of Arti et Amicitiae. In the late 1920s, he retired to Amsterdam and died there in 1931.

His son, Maarten, became one of the best known Dutch painters of the 20th century. Maarten's youngest son, is also a painter; his middle son, Jeroen, is an actor and director; and his eldest is the writer Tim Krabbé. Jeroen's son  is also an artist.

Selected paintings

References

Writings
Handleiding voor het teekenen en schilderen, Van Holkema & Warendorff, 1903

External links

 ArtNet: More paintings by Krabbé.
 Photographs of the Krabbé family  by the Fotostudio Merkelbach from the Stadsarchief Amsterdam

1868 births
1931 deaths
19th-century Dutch painters
20th-century Dutch painters
Dutch male painters
Dutch genre painters
Dutch portrait painters
Military art
British emigrants to the Netherlands
19th-century Dutch male artists
20th-century Dutch male artists